Bang Khae Market or Bang Khae Wet Market is a large wet market in Bangkok, its one of the largest markets of Thonburi side and Bangkok, located on Phet Kasem Road mostly in Bang Khae District.

History
Bang Khae Market is a market along the Khlong Phraya Ratcha Montri or simply Khlong Ratcha Montri (คลองพระยาราชมนตรี; Phraya Ratcha Montri Canal). The area from Khwaeng (แขวง; Sub-district) Bang Wa, Phasi Charoen District to Khwaeng Bang Khae, Bang Khae District. 

Bang Khae Market's origins is an area that is a traditional community. It is a passage for people by boat through the Khlong Phasi Charoen and Khlong Bang Khae, so trading is a way of life. In 1949, the government run by Field Marshal Plaek Phibunsongkhram as the Prime Minister had a policy to keep Bangkok clean and disciplined. Gen. Mangkorn Phromyothee as governor of Phra Nakhon Metropolitan (compared to the current governor of Bangkok) moved the sellers from many places in Phra Nakhon (Bangkok in now), such as Sanam Luang, Royal Plaza to new places viz Thewet Bridge, Tha Tian Market,  Worachak Road (Khlong Thom neighbourhood) or in front of Samsen Power Plant (now Metropolitan Electricity Authority Samsen) include Bang Khae area, which was considered Bangkok suburb at that time.

In the past, the site of the market was not in the present location, but on the Phet Kasem inbound side (catty-corner from the current market location). It was called. "Talat Bo Lha" (ตลาดบ่อหลา; Bo Lha Market).

Presently
Today, Bang Khae Market is a market for selling many kinds of goods such as raw meat, fresh seafood, dry food and ready meals, fruits and vegetables, as well as cheap clothes. It is an open almost all day and busy all the time. In addition, it is divided into five sub-markets, including Wonder Department Store, a small department store in the area.

Besides, in this area also the birthplace of Thongchai "Bird" McIntyre, a superstar of the Thai music industry.

In 2012, Bang Khae Market sellers have jointly opposed the construction of the BTS Blue Line, which Bang Khae station is located in the market area, but not successful.

Nearby places
 Ban Bang Khae (also known as Bang Khae Home for Older Persons)
Tesco Lotus Bang Khae
Seacon Bangkae
The Mall Bang Khae
Bangkhae Condotown
Bangkhae Condo Residence
Wat Nimmanoradi

Transportation
MRT Blue Line: Bang Khae station
BMTA bus: route 7, 7ก, 80, 80ก, 81, 84, 84ก, 91ก, 101, 147, 165, 189  (air cond. 7, 80, 81, 84, 91, 147, 157, 547) include affiliated bus: Wat Sing–Bang Khae
Songthaew (Thai minibus style): fare 5 baht
Khlong Phasi Charoen boat service: Phet Kasem 39 pier

References

Retail markets in Bangkok
Buildings and structures in Bangkok
Bang Khae district
Phasi Charoen district